Thomas Key may refer to:

 Thomas Hewitt Key (1799–1875), English classical scholar
 Thomas Marshall Key (1819–1869), American politician
 Thomas Key (colonel), 19th-century American colonel
 Thomas Key (instrument maker), 19th-century English serpent maker
 Thomas Key (planter), 17th-century American planter
 Thomas Caius (died 1572), English academic and administrator